Sonata for Two Pianos is a composition by Russian composer Igor Stravinsky, premiered in 1944 by Richard Johnston and Nadia Boulanger. First conceived as a solo work, Stravinsky needed to write it for four hands to voice all four melodic lines clearly. It is considered one of Stravinsky's most important compositions for two solo pianos, together with Concerto for Two Pianos.

Structure 

The sonata is in three movements, though one CD recording indexes the theme and four variations of the second movement separately. However, it is in only three movements.

References

Compositions by Igor Stravinsky
Compositions for two pianos
1944 compositions